David Curtis Glover (October 7, 1939 – May 29, 2019), better known as Tony "Little Sun" Glover, was an American blues musician and music critic. He was a harmonica player and singer associated with "Spider" John Koerner and Dave "Snaker" Ray during the early 1960s folk revival. Together, the three released albums under the name Koerner, Ray & Glover. Glover was also the author of diverse "harp" (blues harmonica) songbooks and a co-author, along with Ward Gaines and Scott Dirks, of an award-winning biography of Little Walter, Blues with a Feeling: The Little Walter Story.

Biography
Glover was born in Minneapolis, Minnesota, in 1939. As a teenager he performed in various local bands, playing guitar before taking up the blues harp. In 1963 he joined John Koerner and Dave Ray to form the blues trio Koerner, Ray & Glover. From 1963 to 1971, either solo or in some combination of the trio, they released at least one album a year. The group never rehearsed together or did much at all together. Ray referred to the group as "Koerner and/or Ray and/or Glover".

In the late sixties, Glover was an all-night underground disc jockey on KDWB-AM in Minneapolis before forming the band Nine Below Zero. He also often performed as a duo with Ray and with Koerner, Ray & Glover reunion concerts. In 2007, he produced a documentary video on the trio, titled Blues, Rags and Hollers: The Koerner, Ray & Glover Story.

Glover was the author of several blues harp songbooks and a co-author, along with Ward Gaines and Scott Dirks, of an award-winning biography of Little Walter, Blues with a Feeling: The Little Walter Story, published in 2002.

Glover was a prolific rock critic, having written articles for the Little Sandy Review (1962–1963), Sing Out! (1964–1965), Hullabaloo/Circus (1968–1971), Hit Parader (1968), Crawdaddy (1968), Eye (1968), Rolling Stone (1968–1973), Junior Scholastic (1970), Creem (1974–1976), Request (1990–1999), Twin Cities Blues News (1996-2006), MNBlues.com (1999–present) and the Twin Cities Reader and City Pages. He also wrote liner notes for albums by John Hammond, Sonny Terry, John Lee Hooker, Michael Lessac, Sonny & Brownie, Willie & the Bees, The Jayhawks, and for The Bootleg Series Vol. 4: Bob Dylan Live 1966, The "Royal Albert Hall" Concert.

Glover taught harmonica to David Johansen and Mick Jagger.

Death
Glover died on May 29, 2019 in St. Paul, Minnesota at the age of 79. In 2020 an auction of his memorabilia and effects netted $495,000.

Awards and honors
In 1983 the Minnesota Music Academy named Koerner, Ray and Glover "Best Folk Group" and in 1985 inducted them into the MMA Hall of Fame.

In 2008, Koerner, Ray & Glover were inducted into the Minnesota Blues Hall of Fame under the category Blues Recordings for Blues, Rags and Hollers.

Koerner, Ray & Glover has been honored with a star on the outside mural of the Minneapolis nightclub First Avenue, recognizing performers that have played sold-out shows or have otherwise demonstrated a major contribution to the culture at the iconic venue. Receiving a star "might be the most prestigious public honor an artist can receive in Minneapolis," according to journalist Steve Marsh.

Discography
with Koerner, Ray & Glover
Blues, Rags and Hollers (1963)
Lots More Blues, Rags and Hollers (1964)
The Return of Koerner, Ray & Glover (1965)
Good Old Koerner, Ray & Glover (1972)
One Foot in the Groove (1996)
 with Dave Ray
 Legends in Their Spare Time (1987)
 Ashes in My Whiskey (1990)
 Picture Has Faded (1993)
with John Koerner
Live @ The 400 Bar (2009)
with V3 (w. Galen Michaelson and Jon Rodine)
V3 (2004)

References

External links
 Tony Glover official web page
 Illustrated Koerner, Ray & Glover discography
 
 Koerner, Ray & Glover discovery at Discogs
 Credits at allmusic.com

1939 births
2019 deaths
Musicians from Minneapolis
American male singers
Songwriters from Minnesota
American blues singers
American blues harmonica players
American blues guitarists
American male guitarists
Singers from Minnesota
Guitarists from Minnesota
20th-century American guitarists
20th-century American male musicians
American male songwriters